FRFC may refer to:

 Farleigh Rovers F.C.
 Flight Refuelling F.C.